A designated place is a type of geographic unit used by Statistics Canada to disseminate census data. It is usually "a small community that does not meet the criteria used to define incorporated municipalities or Statistics Canada population centres (areas with a population of at least 1,000 and no fewer than 400 persons per square kilometre)." Provincial and territorial authorities collaborate with Statistics Canada in the creation of designated places so that data can be published for sub-areas within municipalities. Starting in 2016, Statistics Canada allowed the overlapping of designated places with population centres.

In the 2021 Census of Population, Manitoba had 148 designated places, an increase from 135 in 2016. Designated place types in Manitoba include 9 dissolved municipalities, 44 local urban districts, 46 northern communities, and 48 unincorporated urban centres. Manitoba's largest designated place is Oakbank with a population of 5,041.

List

See also 
List of census agglomerations in Manitoba
List of population centres in Manitoba

Notes

References 

 
Designated